Martin Srabotnik (born 19 December 1995) is a Slovenian slalom canoeist who has competed at the international level since 2011.

He won two bronze medals in the K1 team event at the ICF Canoe Slalom World Championships earning them in 2017 and 2021. He also won a silver and a bronze medal in the same event at the European Championships.

World Cup individual podiums

References

External links

 

Living people
Slovenian male canoeists
1995 births
Medalists at the ICF Canoe Slalom World Championships